Helen Louise Maroulis (born September 19, 1991) is an American freestyle wrestler who competes in the women's 55-kg 53-kg and 57-kg categories. She was a gold medalist at the 2015 World Wrestling Championships in Las Vegas, Nevada and a gold medalist at the 2011 Pan American Games in Guadalajara, Mexico. At the 2016 Summer Olympics in Rio de Janeiro, Brazil she became the first-ever American to win a gold medal in women's freestyle wrestling at the Olympic Games.

Background
Maroulis was born in Rockville, Maryland, the daughter of Paula and Yiannis "John" Maroulis. Her father is Greek. She attended Magruder High School for three years, where as a freshman she became the first female wrestler to place at the Maryland state wrestling championships. She was also named Most Outstanding Wrestler of a tournament, by pinning a senior boy who had won the year before, and finished high school with 99 career victories.

She then moved to Marquette Senior High School in Marquette, Michigan and then went to join Missouri Baptist University women's wrestling team in Saint Louis, Missouri, before ultimately transferring to compete for Simon Fraser University in Burnaby, British Columbia, Canada. At the age-group level, Maroulis was a three-time Junior World medalist (bronze in 2008 & 2010, silver in 2011).

As of 2014, she trained at the U.S. Olympic Education Center at Northern Michigan University.
Her grandparents emigrated to the United States from the Greek island Kalamos in the 1960s. Maroulis visited her father's island a few weeks after her victory at Rio, and was given an award by the local community.

Rio Summer Olympics 2016
Maroulis beat Saori Yoshida 4-1 to win a gold medal at the 2016 Rio Olympics. This was the first Olympic gold medal for the United States in a women's wrestling event.

World Championship 2017
Maroulis won her third consecutive gold medal at the world championships or Olympics defeating Olympic bronze medalist Marwa Amri of Tunisia in the finals of the 58-kilogram/128-pound weight class with an 11-0 technical fall.

Pro Wrestling League
On January 16, 2018, Pooja Dhanda defeated Maroulis in the Pro Wrestling League.

World Championship 2018
Maroulis was defeated in the first round by fall by Azerbaijan’s Alyona Kolesnik, a shocking upset for the defending world and Olympic champion. The defeat has been attributed to a serious head injury (concussion from a tournament in January 2018). As Maroulis stated in post-match interview “I’m so used to telling someone, hey, don’t touch my head.” The injury was significant enough to cause Maroulis to delay her world team qualifier match, and significantly limited her live sparring prior to the event. It is reported that she was so limited by the injury that she only returned to live practice about 10 days before her rescheduled qualifying series.

Tokyo Summer Olympics 2020
Maroulis won a bronze medal by defeating Mongolia’s Khongorzul Boldsaikhan after losing to Risako Kawai of Japan in the 57kg semifinals. With the bronze medal, Maroulis became the first female wrestler in U.S. history to win two Olympic medals.

Ivan Yariguin Grand Prix 2022
Maroulis won a gold medal in the 57kg finals by forfeit as her opponent Olga Khoroshavtseva of Russia withdrew.

Match results

! colspan="7"| World Championships & Olympics
|-
! Res.
! Record
! Opponent
! Score
! Date
! Event
! Location
|-
! style=background:white colspan=8 |
|-
| Win
| 32-7
| align=left |  Anshu Malik
| style="font-size:88%"|Fall
| style="font-size:88%"|October 7, 2021
| style="font-size:88%" rowspan=3|2021 World Championship
| style="text-align:left;font-size:88%;" rowspan=3|  Oslo
|-
| Win
| 31-7
| align=left |  Veronika Chumikova
| style="font-size:88%"|10–1
| style="font-size:88%" rowspan=2|October 6, 2021
|-
| Win
| 30-7
| align=left |  Jeannie Kessler
| style="font-size:88%"|Fall
|-
! style=background:white colspan=8 |
|-
| Win
| 29-7
| align=left |  Boldsaikhany Khongorzul
| style="font-size:88%"|11-0
| style="font-size:88%"|August 5, 2021
| style="font-size:88%" rowspan=4|2020 Summer Olympics
| style="text-align:left;font-size:88%;" rowspan=4|  Tokyo
|-
| Loss
| 28-7
| align=left |  Risako Kawai
| style="font-size:88%"|1–2
| style="font-size:88%" rowspan=3|August 4, 2021
|-
| Win
| 28-6
| align=left |  Tetyana Kit
| style="font-size:88%"|8-0
|-
| Win
| 27-6
| align=left |  Rong Ningning
| style="font-size:88%"|8-4
|-
! style=background:white colspan=8 |
|-
| Loss
| 26-7
| align=left |  Alyona Kolesnik
| style="font-size:88%"|Fall
| style="font-size:88%" |October 24, 2018
| style="font-size:88%" |2018 World Championships
| style="text-align:left;font-size:88%;"|  Budapest
|-
! style=background:white colspan=8 |
|-
| Win
| 26-6
| align=left |  Marwa Amri
| style="font-size:88%"|11-0
| style="font-size:88%" rowspan=5|August 23, 2017
| style="font-size:88%" rowspan=5|2017 World Championship
| style="text-align:left;font-size:88%;" rowspan=5|  Paris
|-
| Win
| 25-6
| align=left |  Michelle Fazzari
| style="font-size:88%"|10-0
|-
| Win
| 24-6
| align=left |  Yessica Oviedo
| style="font-size:88%"|11-0
|-
| Win
| 23-6
| align=left |  Elin Nilsson
| style="font-size:88%"|10-0
|-
| Win
| 22-6
| align=left |  Hanbit Kim
| style="font-size:88%"|10-0
|-
! style=background:white colspan=8 |
|-
| Win
| 21-6
| align=left |  Saori Yoshida
| style="font-size:88%"|4-1
| style="font-size:88%" rowspan=5|August 18, 2016
| style="font-size:88%" rowspan=5|2016 Summer Olympics
| style="text-align:left;font-size:88%;" rowspan=5|  Rio de Janeiro
|-
| Win
| 20-6
| align=left |  Sofia Mattsson
| style="font-size:88%"|Fall
|-
| Win
| 19-6
| align=left |  Jong Myong-suk
| style="font-size:88%"|7-4
|-
| Win
| 18-6
| align=left |  Zhong Xuechun
| style="font-size:88%"|10-0
|-
| Win
| 17-6
| align=left |  Yuliya Khalvadzhy
| style="font-size:88%"|12-1
|-
! style=background:white colspan=8 |
|-
| Win
| 16-6
| align=left |  Irina Ologonova
| style="font-size:88%"|11-0
| style="font-size:88%" rowspan=4|September 10, 2015
| style="font-size:88%" rowspan=4|2015 World Championship
| style="text-align:left;font-size:88%;" rowspan=4|  Las Vegas, NV
|-
| Win
| 15-6
| align=left |  Pang Qianyu
| style="font-size:88%"|5-0
|-
| Win
| 14-6
| align=left |  Evelina Nikolova
| style="font-size:88%"|fall
|-
| Win
| 13-6
| align=left |  Brenda Fernández
| style="font-size:88%"|10-0
|-
! style=background:white colspan=8 |
|-
| Win
| 12-6
| align=left |  Katarzyna Krawczyk
| style="font-size:88%"|10-0
| style="font-size:88%" rowspan=4|September 10, 2014
| style="font-size:88%" rowspan=4|2014 World Championship
| style="text-align:left;font-size:88%;" rowspan=4|  Tashkent
|-
| Loss
| 11-6
| align=left |  Chiho Hamada
| style="font-size:88%"|2-6
|-
| Win
| 11-5
| align=left |  Altansetsegiin Battsetseg
| style="font-size:88%"|fall
|-
| Win
| 10-5
| align=left |  Elverine Jiménez
| style="font-size:88%"|fall
|-
! style=background:white colspan=8 |
|-
| Loss
| 9-5
| align=left |  Mimi Hristova
| style="font-size:88%"|fall
| style="font-size:88%" rowspan=4|September 19, 2013
| style="font-size:88%" rowspan=4|2013 World Championship
| style="text-align:left;font-size:88%;" rowspan=4|  Budapest
|-
| Loss
| 9-4
| align=left |  Sofia Mattsson
| style="font-size:88%"|6-7
|-
| Win
| 9-3
| align=left |  Phạm Thị Huệ
| style="font-size:88%"|fall
|-
| Win
| 8-3
| align=left |  Han Kum-ok
| style="font-size:88%"|fall
|-
! style=background:white colspan=8 |
|-
| Loss
| 7-3
| align=left |  Saori Yoshida
| style="font-size:88%"|fall
| style="font-size:88%" rowspan=4|September 28, 2012
| style="font-size:88%" rowspan=4|2012 World Championship
| style="text-align:left;font-size:88%;" rowspan=4|  Strathcona County, Alberta
|-
| Win
| 7-2
| align=left |  Brittanee Laverdure
| style="font-size:88%"|5-0, 4-2
|-
| Win
| 6-2
| align=left |  Maria Prevolaraki
| style="font-size:88%"|3-0, 2-0
|-
| Win
| 5-2
| align=left |  Nadzeya Mikhalkova
| style="font-size:88%"|fall
|-
! style=background:white colspan=8 |
|-
| Loss
| 4-2
| align=left |  Ida-Theres Nerell
| style="font-size:88%"|fall
| style="font-size:88%" rowspan=6|September 15, 2011
| style="font-size:88%" rowspan=6|2011 World Championship
| style="text-align:left;font-size:88%;" rowspan=6|  Istanbul
|-
| Win
| 4-1
| align=left |  Alma Valencia
| style="font-size:88%"|5-0, 4-0
|-
| Win
| 3-1
| align=left |  Emriye Musta
| style="font-size:88%"|6-2, 6-2
|-
| Loss
| 2-1
| align=left |  Saori Yoshida
| style="font-size:88%"|fall
|-
| Win
| 2–0
| align=left |  Valya Trandeva
| style="font-size:88%"|fall
|-
| Win
| 1–0
| align=left |  Aiyim Abdildina
| style="font-size:88%"|6-0, 5-2

References

External links

 
 
 
 
 
 Helen Maroulis Fan Site

American female sport wrestlers
American people of Greek descent
1991 births
Living people
Wrestlers at the 2011 Pan American Games
Pan American Games gold medalists for the United States
American sportswomen
World Wrestling Championships medalists
Wrestlers at the 2016 Summer Olympics
Olympic gold medalists for the United States in wrestling
Medalists at the 2016 Summer Olympics
Pan American Games medalists in wrestling
Sportspeople from Rockville, Maryland
Medalists at the 2011 Pan American Games
Wrestlers at the 2020 Summer Olympics
Medalists at the 2020 Summer Olympics
Olympic bronze medalists for the United States in wrestling
21st-century American women
20th-century American women